Machiel Kiel (born February 28, 1938) is a Dutch professor of art history. Narrow specialist in Ottoman architecture in the Balkans.

For more than half a century after the Second World War, he worked on the grounds, restorations and with the Ottoman archives in Sofia, Istanbul and Ankara.

He personally researched the Ottoman architecture of the Old Bazaar, Skopje before the 1963 Skopje earthquake.

References

Dutch orientalists
Dutch art historians
1938 births
Ottoman studies
Living people